Claudio Borghese (died 1590) was a Roman Catholic prelate who served as Bishop of Grosseto (1576–1590).

Biography
On 22 August 1576, Claudio Borghese was appointed during the papacy of Pope Gregory XIII as Bishop of Grosseto.
He served as Bishop of Grosseto until his death in 1590.

While bishop, he was the principal co-consecrator of: Ascanio I Piccolomini, Coadjutor Archbishop of Siena and Titular Archbishop of Rhodus (1579).

References

External links and additional sources
 (for Chronology of Bishops) 
 (for Chronology of Bishops)  

Date of birth unknown
1590 deaths
16th-century Italian Roman Catholic bishops
Bishops appointed by Pope Gregory XIII
Bishops of Grosseto